Handbook of Middle American Indians (HMAI) is a sixteen-volume compendium on Mesoamerica, from the prehispanic to late twentieth century. Volumes on particular topics were published from the 1960s and 1970s under the general editorship of Robert Wauchope. Separate volumes with particular volume editors  deal with  a number of general topics, including archeology, cultural anthropology, physical anthropology, linguistics, with the last four substantive volumes treating various topics in Mesoamerican ethnohistory, under the editorship of Howard F. Cline. Select volumes have become available in e-book format.

A retrospective review of the HMAI by two anthropologists discusses its history and evaluates it. One review calls it a fundamental work.  Another reviewer says "since the first volume of the HMAI appeared in 1964 is far and away the most comprehensive and erudite coverage of native cultures of any region in the Americas." A review in the journal Science says that "There can be little doubt that, like the Handbook of South American Indians, this monumental synthesis will provide a sound basis for new generalizations and will stimulate additional research to fill the gaps in knowledge and understanding that will become apparent.

Starting in 1981, six volumes in the Supplement to the Handbook of Middle American Indians were published under the general editorship of Victoria Bricker.

Volumes

Volume 1.  Natural Environment and Early Cultures, Robert C. West, volume editor. (1964)
 1. Geohistory and Paleogeography of Middle America (Manuel Maldonado-Koerdell)
 2. Surface Configuration and Associated Geology of Middle America (Robert C. West)
 3. The Hydrography of Middle America (Jorge L. Tamayo, in collaboration with Robert C. West)
 4. The American Mediterranean (Albert Collier)
 5. Oceanography and Marine Life along the Pacific Coast (Carl L. Hubbs and Gunnar I. Roden)
 6. Weather and Climate of Mexico and Central America (Jorge A. Vivo Escoto)
 7. Natural Vegetation of Middle America (Philip L. Wagner)
 8. The Soils of Middle America and their Relation to Indian Peoples and Cultures (Rayfred L. Stevens)
 9. Fauna of Middle America (L. C. Stuart)
 10. The Natural Regions of Middle America (Robert C. West)
 11. The Primitive Hunters (Luis Aveleyra Arroyo de Anda)
 12. The Food-gathering and Incipient Agriculture Stage of Prehistoric Middle America (Richard S. MacNeish)
 13. Origins of Agriculture in Middle America (Paul C. Mangelsdorf, Richard S. MacNeish, and Gordon R. Willey)
 14. The Patterns of Farming Life and Civilization (Gordon R. Willey, Gordon F. Ekholm, and Rene F. Millon)

Volumes 2–3. Archeology of Southern Mesoamerica, Gordon R. Willey, volume editor. (1965)

Volume 4. Archeological Frontiers and External Connections  G.F. Ekholm and G. R. Willey, volume editors. (1964)
 1. Archaeology and Ethnohistory of the Northern Sierra (Charles C. DiPeso)
 2. Archaeology of Sonora, Mexico (Alfred E. Johnson)
 3. Archaeology and Ethnohistory of Lower California (William C. Massey)
 4. Archaic Cultures Adjacent to the Northeastern Frontiers of Mesoamerica (Walter W. Taylor)
 5. Mesoamerica and the Southwestern United States (J. Charles Kelley)
 6. Mesoamerica and the Eastern United States in Prehistoric Times (James B. Griffin)
 7. Archaeological Survey of El Salvador (John M. Longyear, III)
 8. Archaeological Survey of Western Honduras (John B. Glass)
 9. Archaeology of Lower Central America (S. K. Lothrop)
 10. Synthesis of Lower Central American Ethnohistory (Doris Stone)
 11. Mesoamerica and the Eastern Caribbean Area (Irving Rouse)
 12. Mesoamerica and Ecuador (Clifford Evans and Betty J. Meggers)
 13. Relationships between Mesoamerica and the Andean Areas (Donald W. Lathrap)
 14. The Problem of Transpacific Influences in Mesoamerica (Robert Heine-Geldern)
 15. The Role of Transpacific Contacts in the Development of New World Pre-Columbian Civilizations (Philip Phillips)
 
Volume 5. Linguistics, Norman A. McQuown, volume editor. (1968)
 1. History of Studies in Middle American Linguistics (Norman A. McQuown)
 2. Inventory of Descriptive Materials (William Bright)
 3. Inventory of Classificatory Materials (María Teresa Fernández de Miranda)
 4. Lexicostatistic Classification (Morris Swadesh)
 5. Systemic COmparison and Reconstruction (Robert Longacre)
 6. Environmental Correlational Studies (Sarah C. Gudschinsky)
 7. Type Linguistics Descriptions
 A. Classical Nahuatl (Stanley Newman)
 B. Classical Yucatec (Maya) (Norman A. McQuown)
 C. Classical Quiche (Munro S. Edmonson)
 D. Sierra Popoluca (Benjamin F. Elson)
 E. Isthmus Zapotec (Velma B. Pickett)
 F. Huautla de Jimenez Mazatec (Eunice V. Pike)
 G. Jiliapan Pame (Leonardo Manrique C.)
 H. Huamelultec Chontal (Viola Waterhouse)
 8. Language-in-Culture Studies (Miguel León-Portilla)

Volume 6. Social Anthropology, Manning Nash, volume editor. (1967)
 1. Introduction, Manning Nash
 2. Indian Population and its Identification, Anselmo Marino Flores
 3. Agricultural Systems and Food Patterns, Angel Palerm
 4. Settlement Patterns, William T. Sanders
 5. Indian Economies, Manning Nash
 6. Contemporary Pottery and Basketry, George M. Foster
 7. Laquer, Katharine D. Jenkins
 8. Textiles and Costume, A.H. Gayton
 9. Drama, Dance and Music, Gertrude Prokosch Kurath
 10. Play: Games, Gossip, and Humor
 11.  Kinship and Family, A. Kimball Romney
 12. Compadrinazgo, Robert Ravicz
 13. Local and Territoria Units, Eva Hunt and June Nash
 14. Political and Religious Organizations, Frank Cancian
 15. Levels of Communal Relations, Eric R. Wolf
 16. Annual Cycle and Fiesta Cycle, Ruben E. Reina
 17. Sickness and Social Relations, Richard N. Adams and Arthur J. Rubel
 18. Narrative Folklore, Munro S. Edmonson
 19. Religious Syncretism, William Madsen
 20. Ritual and Mythology, E. Michael Mendelson
 21. Psychological Orientations, Benjamin N. Colby
 22. Ethnic Relationships, Julio de la Fuente
 23.  Acculturation, Ralph L. Beals
 24.  Nationalization, Richard N. Adams
 25. Directed Change, Robert H. Ewald
 26.  Urbanization and Industrialization, Arden R. King

Volumes 7–8, Ethnology,  Evon Z. Vogt, volume editor. (1969)

Volume 7. Introduction (Evon Z. Vogt)

Section I The Maya
 2. The Maya: Introduction (Evon Z. Vogt)
 3. Guatemalan Highlands (Manning Nash)
 4. The Maya of Northwestern Guatemala (Charles Wagley)
 5. The Maya of the Midwestern Highlands (Sol Tax and Robert Hinshaw)
 6. Eastern Guatemalan Highlands: The Pokomames and Chorti (Ruben E. Reina)
 7. Chiapas Highlands (Evon Z. Vogt)
 8. The Tzotzil (Robert M. Laughlin)
 9. The Tzeltal (Alfonso Villa Rojas)
 10. The Tojolabal (Roberta Montagu)
 11. Maya Lowlands: The Chontal, Chol, and Kekchi (Alfonso Villa Rojas)
 12. The Maya of Yucatán (Alfonso Villa Rojas)
 13. The Lacandon (Gertrude Duby and Frans Blom)
 14. The Huastec (Robert M. Laughlin)

Section II Southern Mexican Highlands and Adjacent Coastal Regions
 15. Southern Mexican Highlands and Adjacent Coastal Regions: Introduction (Ralph L. Reals)
 16. The Zapotec of Oaxaca (Laura Nader)
 17. The Chatino (Gabriel DeCicco)
 18. The Mixtec (Robert Ravicz and A. Kimball Romney)
 19. The Trique of Oaxaca (Laura Nader)
 20. The Amuzgo (Robert Ravicz and A. Kimball Romney)
 21. The Cuicatec (Roberto J. Weitlaner)
 22. The Mixe, Zoque, and Popoluca (George M. Foster)
 23. The Huave (A. Richard Diebold, Jr.)
 24. The Popoloca (Walter A. Hoppe, Andres Medina, and Roberto J. Weitlaner)
 25. The Ichcatec (Walter A. Hoppe and Roberto J. Weitlaner)
 26. The Chocho (Walter A. Hoppe and Roberto J. Weitlaner)
 27. The Mazatec (Roberto J. Weitlaner and Walter A. Hoppe)
 28. The Chinantec (Roberto J. Weitlaner and Howard F. Cline)
 29. The Tequistlatec and Tlapanec (D. L. Olmsted)
 30. The Cuitlatec (Susana Drucker, Roberto Escalante, and Roberto J. Weitlaner)

Volume 8, Section III: Central Mexican Highlands
 31. Central Mexican Highlands: Introduction (Pedro Carrasco)
 32. The Nahua (William Madsen)
 33. The Totonac (H. R. Harvey and Isabel Kelly)
 34. The Otomi (Leonardo Manrique C.)

Section IV Western Mexico
 35. The Tarascans (Ralph L. Beals)

Section V Northwest Mexico
 36. Northwest Mexico: Introduction (Edward H. Spicer)
 37. The Huichol and Cora (Joseph E. Grimes and Thomas B. Hinton)
 38. The Southern Tepehuan and Tepecano (Carroll L. Riley)
 39. The Northern Tepehuan (Elman R. Service)
 40. The Yaqui and Mayo (Edward H. Spicer)
 41. The Tarahumara (Jacob Fried)
 42. Contemporary Ethnography of Baja California, Mexico (Roger C. Owen)
 43. Remnant Tribes of Sonora: Opata, Pima, Papago, and Seri (Thomas B. Hinton).

Volumes 6 & 7 were reviewed when the appeared. One reviewer highlights several articles, including those by Eric R. Wolf, Angel Palerm, and Willilam Sanders, but he goes on to say "These volumes are ... more valuable for reference than for reading. Sections dealing with distribution, history, and bibliography are very useful, but sections dealing with social structure or the character of the peoples generally fail to provide integrated analyses indicating the essential features."

Volume 9. Physical Anthropology, T.D. Stewart, volume editor. (1970)

Volume 10–11. Archeology of Northern Mesoamerica, G. F. Ekholm and Ignacio Bernal, volume editors. (1971)

Volumes 12–15, Guide to Ethnohistorical Sources, Howard F. Cline, Volume editor.

Volume 12, Guide to Ethnohistorical Sources, Part 1. (1972)
 1. “Introductory Notes on Territorial Divisions of Middle America” , Howard F. Cline, pp. 17–62
 2. “Colonial New Spain, 1519-1786: Historical Notes on the Evolution of Minor Political Jurisdictions”, Peter Gerhard, pp. 63–137
 3. “Viceroyalty to Republics, 1786-1952: Historical Notes on the Evolution of Middle American Political Units,” Howard F. Cline, pp. 138–165
 4. “Ethnohistorical Regions of Middle America,”  Howard F. Cline, pp. 166–182
 5. “The Relaciones Geográficas of the Spanish Indies, 1577-1648,” Howard F. Cline, pp. 183–242
 6. “The Pinturas (Maps) of the Relaciones Geográficas, with Catalogue,” Donald Robertson, pp. 243–278
 7. “The Relaciones Geográficas, 1579-1586: Native Languages,” H.R. Harvey, pp. 279–323
 8. “A Census of the Relaciones Geográficas of New Spain, 1579-1612,” Howard F. Cline, pp. 324–369
 9. “The Relaciones Geográficas of Spain, New Spain, and the Spanish Indies: An Annotated Bibliography,” Howard F. Cline, pp. 370–395
 10. “The Relaciones Geográficas of Mexico and Central America, 1740-1792,” Robert C. West, pp. 396–452.
 
Volume 13. Guide to Ethnohistorical Sources, Part 2. (1973)
 11. “Published Collections of Documents Relating to Middle American Ethnohistory”, Charles Gibson
 12. “An Introductory Survey of Secular Writings in the European Tradition on Colonial Middle America, 1503-1818,” J. Benedict Warren, pp. 42–137
 13. “Religious Chronicles and Historians: A Summary and Annotated Bibliography,” Ernest J. Burrus, S.J.
 14. “Bernardino de Sahagún, 1499-1590
 A. “Sahagún and His Works,” Nicolau d’Olwer and Howard F. Cline, 186-206
 B. “Sahagún’s Primeros Memoriales.” Tepepulco, H. B. Nicholson, pp. 207–217
 C. “Sahagún’s  Materials and Studies,” Howard F. Cline, pp. 218–239
 15. “Antonio de Herrera, 1549-1625,” Manuel Ballesteros Gaibrois, pp. 240–255
 16. “Juan de Torquemada, 1564-1624,” José Alcina Franch, pp. 256–275
 17. “Francisco Javier Clavigero, 1731-1787,” Charles F. Ronan, S. J., pp. 276–297
 18. “Charles Etienne Brasseur de Bourbourg, 1814-1874,” Carroll Edward Mace, pp. 298–325
 19. “Hubert Howe Bancroft, 1832-1918,” Howard F. Cline, pp. 326–347
 20. “Eduard Georg Seler, 1849-1922,” H. B. Nicholson, pp. 348–369
 21. “Select Nineteenth-Century Mexican Writers on Ethnohistory,” Howard F. Cline, pp. 370–403. Carlos María de Bustamante, José Fernando Ramírez, Manuel Orozco y Berra, Joaquín García Icazbalceta, Alfredo Chavero, Francisco del Paso y Troncoso

Volume 14. Guide to Ethnohistorical Sources Part 3. (1975)
 22. “A Survey of Native Middle American Pictorial Manuscripts,” John B. Glass, pp. 3–80
 23. “A Census of Native Middle American Pictorial Manuscripts,” John B. Glass with Donald Robertson, pp. 81–252
 24. “Techialoyan Manuscripts and Paintings with a Catalog,” Donald Robertson, pp. 253–280
 25. “A Census of Middle American Testerian Manuscripts,” John B. Glass, pp. 281–296
 26. “A Catalogue of Falsified Middle American Pictorial Manuscripts,” John B. Glass, pp. 297–309
 Illustrations and maps, 1-103

Volume 15. Guide to Ethnohistorical Sources Part 4. (1975)
 27A. “Prose Sources in the Native Historical Tradition,” Charles Gibson, pp 312–319
 27B. “A Census of Middle American Prose Manuscripts in the Native Historical Tradition,” Charles Gibson and John B. Glass, pp. 322–400
 28. “A Checklist of Institutional Holdings of Middle American Manuscripts in the Native Historical Tradition,” John B. Glass, pp. 401–472
 29. “The Boturini Collection,” John B. Glass, pp. 473–486
 30. “Middle American Ethnohistory:  An Overview,” H. B. Nicholson, pp. 487–505
 31. “Index of Authors, Titles, and Synonyms,” John B. Glass, pp. 506–536
 32. “Annotated References,” John B. Glass, pp. 537–724.
 
Volume 16. Sources Cited and Artifacts Illustrated. Margaret A.L. Harrison, volume editor. (1976) – Bibliography for all volumes.

Supplement to the Handbook of Middle American Indians

General Editor, Victoria Bricker

Volume 1. Archeology, Jeremy A. Sabloff, volume editor. (1982)
Volume 2. Linguistics with the assistance of Patricia A. Andrews (1984)
Volume 3. Literatures, Munro S. Edmunson, volume editor. (1985)
Volume 4. Ethnohistory, Ronald Spores, volume editor (1986)
Volume 5.  Epigraphy, Victoria Bricker (1991)
Volume 6. Ethnology, John D. Monaghan, volume editor (2000)

See also
 Handbook of North American Indians
 Handbook of South American Indians

References

Anthropology books
Non-fiction books about indigenous peoples of the Americas
Mesoamerican studies
History of Mexico
Encyclopedias of culture and ethnicity
Monographic series